Riverview Park is an unincorporated community in Southeastern Pennsylvania about five miles north of Reading.  It lies within the Muhlenberg Township and relies on the municipal services of that township.

Boundaries
Originally, the name Riverview Park applied only to certain developments  Today, the name has generally come to mean any area in Muhlenberg Township west of PA Route 61, excluding the older communities of Muhlenberg Park and Tuckerton.  Riverview Park lies entirely within the 19605 ZIP code and is serviced by the Reading Post Office. 

The local school district is the Muhlenberg School District.

History
Riverview Park is a collection of mostly post–World War II housing developments on the western side of Muhlenberg Township, with most of the development occurring between 1950 and 1975.  Originally, the area was a patchwork of family farms, and the development tracts correspond roughly to the subdivision of those large parcels of land.

Though development flourished in the late 1940s and early 1950s, plans to subdivide the western half of Muhlenberg Township were proposed in the early 20th century.  The first subdivision of homes along River Road was actually recorded in the year 1913.  The development was known as "River View", and was made up of land previously land owned by William Luden, the owner of Luden's Cough Drops.  At one time, Luden operated a picnic grove and park for his employees on this site.  A grand development known as "Hyroth" (a play on words for the subdivision of the High Estate) was proposed and recorded in 1926.  This was the land north of Whitmer Rd to the Schuylkill River.  Development never came to be, and the plan was declared void in favor of the newer plan for Whitford Hill (1974).  The area known as Reading Crest was subdivided in 1924, although it was not fully developed until well into the 1990s.  This was the area to the west of Reading Crest Avenue with Carolina Avenue on the south, Kentucky Avenue on the north and Hilltop Avenue on the west.

George Eisenbrown's "Muhlenberg Park" development led him to divide a vast swath of land on the northern side of Leisz Bridge Road and to the west of Soudt's Ferry Bridge Road.  The subdivision of lots was recorded in 1946 and was known as "Riverview Park".  To serve the post-war population and development boom, an elementary school was constructed on Stoudt's Ferry Bridge Road just south of Hain Avenue.  The school was sold around 1980 and is now the Calvary Church of the Nazarene.  In 1947, Riverview Park Section 2 was divided.  This is the area on both sides of Grandell Ave.

Some of the other post–World War II developments were Hain's Acres (1953), Sheidy Acres (1956), and Wheatland (1961).

A second phase of development occurred on unbuilt lands (mostly in the far northwest corner of Muhlenberg Township) in the late 1980s and throughout the 1990s and early 2000s.  Some of these developments are Whitford Hill, Wilfox Acres, Rivers Bend, Eagle's Landing, King's View, and Heather Knoll.

Originally, Bodey's School House educated the children of the area.  The original school house is still standing along Stoudt's Ferry Bridge Road, though it has long since been converted for residential use.

Today
It contains the Laurel Run, Laurelain Playground, Reading Crest Park, Felix Dam, and Stoudt's Ferry Playground.  The Muhlenberg Township Recreation Building is located along River Road.

Most of this area is designated as R-1 or R-2 zoning, meaning only low to medium density residential structures are allowed.  There are no commercial establishments in Riverview Park.  The area has one municipal swimming pool - the Laurel Run Swimming Association (members only) located at 3500 Willow Grove Ave. 

There are two churches in the area - Good Shepherd Lutheran Church (at Stoudt's Ferry Bridge Road and Tuckerton Road) and Calvary Church of the Nazarene.

Unincorporated communities in Berks County, Pennsylvania
Unincorporated communities in Pennsylvania